Harold Taylor (born 1912) was an English footballer who played in the Football League for Liverpool and Stoke City.

Career
Taylor joined Stoke City from local feeder club Stoke St Peter's in 1929. And after a slow start to his Stoke career he had a decent 1931–32 season where he scored nine goals in 17 league matches. At the end of the season he left for Liverpool where he became a useful back-up player making 72 appearances in five years at Anfield.

Career statistics

References

External links
 Liverpool profile at lfchistory.net

English footballers
Stoke City F.C. players
Liverpool F.C. players
English Football League players
1912 births
Footballers from Stoke-on-Trent
Year of death missing
Association football forwards